Cribrospongia is an extinct genus of prehistoric sponges in the family Cribrospongiidae. The species C. elegans is from the Jurassic period and has been found in Germany.

See also 
 List of prehistoric sponge genera

References 

 Cours élémentaire de paléontologie et de géologie stratigraphiques. A d'Orbigny, 1849
 Note sur les polypiers fossiles. A d'Orbigny, 1849

External links 

 
 

Hexactinellida genera
Hexactinosa